Bonnie Randolph Hoffman was an American professional golfer who played on the LPGA Tour. She played under both Bonnie Randolph and Bonnie Randolph Hoffman.

Randolph won once on the LPGA Tour in 1958.

LPGA Tour wins
1958 Kansas City Open

References

American female golfers
LPGA Tour golfers
Ohio State University alumni
Year of birth missing
Possibly living people